Polka Dot Shorts is a Canadian children's television series produced by TVOntario, which has been broadcast around the world. It was created, produced, and edited by Jed MacKay. Approximately 180 episodes were produced from 1993 to 2001, all produced by MacKay and directed by Michael McNamara. The series won a Gemini Award from the Academy of Canadian Cinema and Television in 2000 for "Best Pre-School Program or Series".

About
The series is based on Polka Dot Door, and stars the characters Polkaroo, Humpty, Dumpty, Bear and Marigold. The characters are portrayed by "physical theater" actors in large costumes; Marigold's performer, for example, had a ballet and circus background. Charles P. Schott ("Bear") was a Gemini Awards finalist for "Best Performer in a Pre-School Series" in 2002.

Originally, each episode started with a human host (Deborah Drakeford) introducing the episode to a gathering of children as she was about to read the story from a book. The stories themselves were dramatized by actors in large suits, playing the puppets from Polka Dot Door, while the reader provided the dialogue. A new character was added to the Polka Dot Door family: Polkaroo's pet, Bibble. Although Bibble was only capable of making sounds that loosely resembled "bibblebibblebibble", he did so in various tones which indicated his mood.

At one point in every episode, one or more of the characters would discover a large pair of polka dot shorts, and exclaim, "A great big pair of polka dot shorts! How did they get there?" Polkaroo's response would be, "I haven't the foggiest!"

Some episodes were done entirely in rhyme, in which case the character who found the polka dot shorts would exclaim, "Polka dot shorts, a great big pair! How on earth did they get there?"

After the first two seasons the episodes were re-edited. The human hostess/storyteller was deleted, and the show would begin immediately.

The show has been broadcast on the CBBC and Living TV's morning slot Tiny Living in the UK as well as being released on video by Abbey Home Media.
A live theatre production toured across the UK in the early 2000s.

Characters
Polkaroo (played by Greg Lanthier, voiced by Andrew Sabiston): A green kangaroo-like animal with yellow hair, a red nose, a long yellow furry tail, a red-and-yellow polka dot on his neck and a gown covered in polka dots. He appears in every episode. He lives in a small house with his pet Bibble. He enjoys having his friends round to play and is mostly the one who finds the polka dot shorts. He sometimes talks in rhyme, and when his friends argue or do something he doesn't like, he often interrupts them with "Excuse me".

Bibble: Polkaroo's mischievous pet which looks like a multi-coloured mop head covered in pom-poms. Often seen moving about making a "bibbly" sound, hence his name. He likes to pull pranks, and sometimes annoys the others with them.

Humpty (played by Line Roberge, voiced by Tony Daniels): A big green egg with purplish hair and a white nose. He wears a burgundy coloured suit patterned with pink roses, a tie with a large H on it, and green boots. Humpty is playful and sometimes a bit mischievous, but he always goes out of his way to help his friends. When the gang start to feel scared or nervous, he often says "Pull yourself together." He is Dumpty's older brother.

Dumpty (played by Brunella Battista, voiced by Julie Lemieux): Humpty's younger brother. He is brown coloured with a blue checked nose. He wears a cream-coloured cap with the letter D on it, a blue bow tie, a blue suit with flowers and checks on it, and brown boots. The youngest of the group, he loves to help and wants to fit in. He sometimes annoys his older brother Humpty, but deeply cares for him.

Bear (played by Charles P. Schott, voiced by Brian Moffatt): A brown bear who is Polkaroo's best friend and wears a green bow tie with white polka dots. He has a great fondness for honey, speaks with a posh accent, and can sometimes be a bit of a show-off. He often says "Coincidence, I think not."

Marigold (played by Alisa Walton, voiced by Deborah Drakeford): A kind-hearted doll with orange yarn-like hair in pigtails. She wears a green dress with flowers on it, yellow-and-white striped leggings, and black buckle shoes. She loves gardening and grows many different plants. She often says "You know what? I'll tell you what."

Episodes

Series 1 (1994)
Shadow Dancer

The Rookie

Treasure Map

Goodnight Polkaroo

The Ball That Got Broken

Just For Two

Series 2 (1995)
Sweet and Sour Surprise

Small Comfort

Whip Whop Woes

Thunder Bear

Bibble's Bubble Bath

Rainbow Bird

Humpty's Fair Share

Not Enough Helpers

A Star Is Born

Great White Bibble

Home Sweet Home

Cutler in The Cake

Phantom of The Nursery Rhyme

Polkaroo of The Jungle

Aloha

Unbearable

The Holden Pear

Sleeping Beauty

Show Me The Honey

Royal Visit

Humptanic

King Dumpty

Kla Two

Picture Perfect

Knock Knock

Jack and The Beanstalk

Cereal Bowl

A Windy Day

Lots of Spots

The Sandwich

Seasons Greetings Polkaroo

Series 3 (1996)

Badge of Merit

Polkaroo The Painter

Hooray for Dumpty

In The Bag

Incredible Shrinking Plant

Big Boot

Polkarobot

Vote For Me

The Bibble Ra

Bibble Day

Magnet Mayhem

Polkaroo's Tanksgiving

The Snowman

Bibbles Birthday

Knock on Wood

Pardon My Garden

The Great Obstacle Race

The Wonderfully Marvelous Thingamajig

Series 4 (2004)

A Champion Chomper

See also
Gisèle's Big Backyard, a segment on TVO Kids where the characters appeared after this show ended

External links
 

TVO original programming
Canadian television shows featuring puppetry
Sentient toys in fiction
1993 Canadian television series debuts
2001 Canadian television series endings
English-language television shows
Television shows filmed in Toronto
1990s Canadian children's television series
2000s Canadian children's television series
Television series about bears
CBeebies